District of Columbia Route 295 (DC 295), also known as the Anacostia Freeway as well as the Kenilworth Avenue Freeway north of East Capitol Street, is a freeway in the District of Columbia, and currently the only signed numbered route in the District that is not an Interstate Highway or U.S. Highway.  Also, DC 295 is one of the few city-level signed route numbers in the United States, along with Charlotte Route 4.  The south end is at the junction of Interstate 295 (I-295), I-695, and the southern end of the 11th Street Bridges; its north end is at the border with Maryland where it continues as Maryland Route 201 (MD 201) and then the Baltimore–Washington Parkway (unsigned Maryland Route 295).

Route description

DC 295 starts at a split from I-295 and I-695 at the 11th Street Bridges in Anacostia. From there, it continues northeasterly along the Anacostia River to the DC-Maryland border. DC 295, I-295, and the Baltimore–Washington Parkway, while administratively distinct, form one continuous freeway linking the southern portion of the Capital Beltway to Baltimore.  Mileposts continue the sequence of I-295 from the split. Frontage roads near the north end are known as Kenilworth Avenue, which is the name of MD 201 after splitting from the main freeway. DC 295 is part of the National Highway System.

History
What is now DC 295 was originally part of two separate highways: the Anacostia Freeway and the Kenilworth Expressway. It was first conceived by the National Capital Park and Planning Commission in 1950 as a connector route between the Baltimore–Washington Parkway at Kenilworth Avenue and the Capital Beltway near Oxon Hill. The route would provide access to the Anacostia waterfront, which included Bolling Air Force Base and the Anacostia Naval Station. In 1955, District officials approved the portion of the route between Suitland Parkway and East Capitol Street; the remainder of the route was approved in 1956. The southern portion of the route, from the Beltway to the 11th Street Bridges, was given a financial boost when it was included in the Interstate Highway System. The route was designated I-295 by AASHTO in 1958.

Work on the Kenilworth Expressway, the portion from East Capitol to the Baltimore-Washington Parkway, began in 1952 and ended in October of 1957. Construction of the Expressway included four pedestrian bridges over it. It was all part of the same project that built the East Capitol Street Bridge at the time. The Kenilworth Interchange, between the Expressway, US-50 and the Parkway started work in 1956 and ended at the same time as the Expressway. 

Initial construction of the Anacostia Freeway began in the summer of 1957 with the East Capitol Street overpass over Kenilworth Avenue and was completed in 1964.  The final part of the project, the connecting ramps to the 11th Street Bridges opened the following year.

The Expressway between Benning Road and the District Line was built on the right of way of the former Benning streetcar line, which is why parts of it are narrow with short entrances and exits.  Until May 1, 1949, streetcar routes 10 and 12 operated from downtown to Deane Avenue.  Route 10 continued to Kenilworth, just inside the District Line.  Route 12 turned off and ran to Seat Pleasant.  That right of way was later paved and it is now called Nannie Helen Burroughs Avenue.

The southern portion of Anacostia freeway, I-295, officially ends on a ramp to the 11th Street Bridges, though it originally referred to everything south to Oxon Cove. For years the northern portion between there and the District Line was often referred to as Route 295 even though it bore no such markings. It was not long after parts of the Baltimore-Washington Parkway in Maryland were numbered MD 295 in the 1980s that the District of Columbia numbered its portion as DC 295.

Exit list
Exit numbers were added in 2014 as part of the 11th Street Bridges reconstruction. The entire route is in Washington, D.C.

See also

 List of numbered highways in Washington, D.C.

References

External links

 
 Steve Anderson's DCroads.net: Anacostia Freeway (I-295 and DC 295)
 Steve Anderson's DCroads.net: Kenilworth Avenue Freeway (DC 295)

295
Streets in Washington, D.C.